The 1904–05 season was East Stirlingshire Football Club's fourth season in the Scottish Football League, being admitted to the Scottish Football League Second Division. The club also competed in the minor Stirlingshire Cup.

Fixtures and results

Scottish Second Division

Table

Results by round

Other

Stirlingshire Cup

See also
List of East Stirlingshire F.C. seasons

References

External links
East Stirlingshire FC official site

East Stirlingshire F.C. seasons
East Stirlingshire